Askildsen is a surname. Notable people with the surname include:

Arne Askildsen (1898–1982), Norwegian bailiff and politician
Kjell Askildsen (1929-2021), Norwegian writer
Kristoffer Askildsen (born 2001), Norwegian footballer 

Norwegian-language surnames